The former East White Oak School also known as East White Oak Community Center, is a historic school building for African-American students located at Greensboro, Guilford County, North Carolina. It was built in 1916, and is a one-story, seven bay, Colonial Revival style frame building.  It features a portico supported by four solid wood columns.  One-story additions were built in the 1920s or 1930s to form a square-shaped building.  The school closed in 1946, and subsequently housed a YMCA and community center.

It was listed on the National Register of Historic Places in 1992.

References

African-American history of North Carolina
School buildings on the National Register of Historic Places in North Carolina
Colonial Revival architecture in North Carolina
School buildings completed in 1916
Schools in Greensboro, North Carolina
National Register of Historic Places in Guilford County, North Carolina
1916 establishments in North Carolina